This is an incomplete list of the live performances undertaken by French-Italian singer Dalida.

1950s

1955 
Villa d'Este
Drap d'Or

1956 
9 April — Paris (Olympia); Numéro un de demain

1957 
27 February to 19 March — Paris (Olympia); vedette anglaise of C. Aznavour
19 April to 1er May — Paris (Bobino); vedette américaine of O. Laure
8 May — Paris (Olympia); Musicorama
Tour of 40 days with J. Valton et A. Cordy
10 May — Gala des étoiles à Bordeaux
15 May — Gala des étoiles
19 September to 9 October — Paris (Olympia); vedette américaine of G. Bécaud
Paris (Olympia); vedette américaine of Compagnons de la chanson
Octobre — Tour in north
14 December - Bruxelles (Ancienne Belgique)
16 December - Bruxelles (Cirque royal); nuit électrique
Marseille (Alcazar)

1958 
Tour with J. Yanne
6 March - Paris (Olympia); Musicorama
été - Algeria
23 August - Orange (Théatre antique)
9 to 28 October - Paris (Bobino)
Avignon

1959 
Tour in Algeria
21 February - Liège
April - Le Caire (Rivoli)
14 May - Paris (Olympia); Musicorama
27 May - Nancy (Gala des étoiles)
2 June - Orléans (Gala des étoiles)
9 June - Lyon (Gala des étoiles)
25 June - Berlin (Deutschland hall)
31 July - Genève (Switzerland)
23 September to 12 October - Paris (Théâtre de l'étoile)
22 October to 2 November - Paris (Bobino)
7 November - Bruxelles (Ancienne Belgique)
13 décembre - Lausanne, Théâtre de Beaulieu (Switzerland)

1960s

1960 
16 April - Knokke le Zoute
24 May - Montpellier (Gala des étoiles)

1961 
18 February 1961 - Téhéran
Tour with D. Gérard et J.J. Debout
Tour with R. Anthony
14 March - Nancy (Gala des étoiles)
20 May - Oostende (Kuursal Oostende)
1er August - Arcachon
27 August - Saint-Raphaël (Théâtre de Verdure)
30 August - Juan les pins
November - Tour of 20 days in south and east of France
3 December - Lyon (Palais d'hiver)
7 December et suivants - Paris (Olympia)
30 December - Bruxelles (Ancienne Belgique)

1962 
April - one month tour in Italy
July - Saïgon (Théâtre Rex)
5 August - Pologne (Casino Riva-Bella)
8 August - Montreux, Casino (Switzerland)
12 August - Genève, Fêtes de Genève (Switzerland)
18 December - Paris (Musicorama)
Espagne
Canada

1963 
24 June - Jambes; Tour de France
July - Pologne
24 December (or 1964) - Taormina (Casino Kursal)

1964 
23 mai - Genève (Switzerland)
Tour à partir du 14 June with Romuald et Henri Tisot
26 June - Fribourg, Théâtre Livio (Switzerland)
28 June - Thonon les bains
13 July - Orléans
13 August - Draguignan
3 to 21 September - Paris (Olympia)
September - Tourtelle
7 October - Bruxelles (Cinéma Métropole)
Marseille (Gymnase)

1965 
2 February - Paris (Olympia); Musicorama
Mars - Paris (Bobino); Musicorama
26 June - Angoulème
June - Maroc
9 July - Montreux (Switzerland)
24 July - Beaucaire
9 August - Montreux (Switzerland)
11 August - Eze
August - Saint-Jean de Tyrosse
December - Algeria; Tlemcem, Sidi bel abbes, Oran, Mostaganée, ...

1966 
13 February - Paris (Olympia); Musicorama
27 March - Monaco (Sporting)
2 April - Villiers en lieu
3 April - Sagy
30 April - Forêt de Moulières
28 April to 4 May - Gala en Espagne
Mont Saint-Michel
6 May - Toulouse
15 May - Longwy
28 May - Epinay sur seine
2 June - Mariage d'Orlando à Rome
4 June - Mehun sur Yèvre
5 June - Bessèges
8 et 9 June - Casablanca
12 June - Givor
18 June - Montrond
19 June - Amiens
25 to 29 June - Tchécoslovaquie; Festival of Bratislava and Prague
2 July - Belleville en Beaujolais
3 July - Grenoble
10 July - Lapalisse
12 July - La roche posay
13 July - Ile d'Yeu
16 July - Briare
17 July - Lamothe Beuvron
17 July - Douai les fontaines; fête de la rose
19 July - Néris
21 July - Valbonne
24 July - Fourmies
27 July - Pornichet (Casino)
31 July - Saint-Girons
1er August - Orthez
7 August - Saint-Paul de fenouillet
8 August - Villeneuve de Marsan
12 August - Colmar
14 August - Magnac laval
15 August - Villefranche
22 August - Fabras
27 August - Nice
29 August - Bergerac
1er October - Paris (Mutualité)
6 October - Langres
8 October - Le Gornay-sur-Marne
16 October - Landrecis
29 October - Berne (Switzerland)
6 November - Lyon (Bourse du travail)
November - Tananarive; 2 galas
November - Saint-Denis; Réunion, 2 galas
2 December - Notre-Dame de Gravenchon
4 December - Hassi Messaoud; Algeria, and other galas
31 December - Toulouse
Armentière

1967 
25 et 26 January - San Remo festival
25 February - Maisse
21 June to 4 September: Tour Europe 1 et Antargaz; 21–28 June: Circuit du Midi-Libre; 29 June - 23 July: Tour de France; 27 July - 4 September: Tour des plages
21 June - Lons-le-Saunier
22 June - Dijon
23 June - Troyes
24 June - Reims
25 June - Sarcelles
26 June - Meulan
27 June - Vernon
28 June - Angers
29 June - Laval
30 June - Saint-Malo
1er July - Caen
2 July - Amiens
3 July - Roubaix
4 July - Jambes
5 July - Metz
6 July - Strasbourg
7 July - Belfort
9 July - Divonne-les-bains
10 July - Briançon
11 July - Digne
12 July - Marseille
13 July - Carpentras
14 July - Sète
16 July - Toulouse
17 July - Luchon
18 July - Pau
19 July - Bordeaux
20 July - Limoges
21 July - Clermont
22 July - Fontainebleau
23 July - Versailles
27 July - Royan
28 July - Saint-Pierre-d'Oleron
29 July - Chatelaillon
30 July - La Rochelle
31 July - Saint-Martin-De-Re
1er August - La Tranche
2 August - Les Sables
3 August - Lorient
4 August - Noirmoutier
5 August - saint-Brevin
6 August - Nantes
7 August - La Baule
8 August - Saint-Nazaire
9 August - Vannes
10 August - Carnac
11 August - Quiberon
12 August - Quimperlé
13 August - Pontivy
14 August - Quimper
15 August - Morgat
16 August - Brest
17 August - Saint-Quay-Portrieux
18 August - Perros Guirrec
19 August - Dinard
20 August - Avranches
21 August - Granville
22 August - Courseulles
23 August - Cabourg
24 August - Deauville
25 August - Le Havre
26 August - Fécamp
27 August - Dieppe
28 August - Le Treport
29 August - Berck Plage
30 August - Boulogne-sur-Mer
31 August - Calais
1er September - Dunkerque
2 September - Douai
3 September - Arras
4 September - Rouen
5 to 23 October - Paris (Olympia)
17 October - Gonflans-Saint-Honorine
November - Gala à travers la France
2 December - Melun
3 December - Pont de veau
4 December - Meaux
11 December - Thionville
12 December - Nancy

1968 
10 February - Gstaad, Hôtel Windsor (Switzerland)
14 February - Grenoble
17 to 27 February - Tour Italie
17 March - Saint Hilaire Les Loges
23 March - Bourgoin
30 March - Beaupreau
31 March - Challan
13 April - Chasselay
28 April - Niort
30 April - Longwy
May - Amérique du Sud (10 jours)
May - Canada (1 week)
May - Antilles (1 week)
May - Japon (10 jours)
Italie - Cantagiro
19 June présentation à San Remo
20 June Cueno
21 June Borgosesia
22 June Savona
23 June Sestri Levante
24 June Genova
25 June Marina di Massa
26 June Montecatini
27 June Follonica
28 June Ostia
29 June Torre del Greco
30 June repos
1 July Perugia
2 July Macerata
3 July Senigallia
4 July Ferrara
5 July Recoaro; 1/2 finale
6 July Recoaro; finale
14 July - Le Havre
30 August - Palerme
9 November - Creil
16 November - Potigny
23 November - Zurich (Switzerland)

1969 
9 to 11 January - Gala en Italie; Milan, ...
January - Cannes; Midem
22 February - Deux Alpes
23 February - Saint-Etienne
7 March - Rome (Palazzo dello sport)
12 to 14 March - Berlin
25 et 26 March - Belgrade
15 to 27 April - Tour France
April - Sénégal
25 May - Rémérangles; Grande nuit des fleurs
15 to 31 July - Tour Italie
1er August - La Gacilly
3 August - Brioude
5 August - Selestat
6 August - Evian
8 August -Saint-Flour
9 August - Saint-Cyr
11 et 12 August - Athènes
13 August - Nice
14 August - Fréjus
16 August - Knokke le zoute
17 August - Boulogne sur mer
20 August - Dax
23 August - Château Boussac
25 August - Porto Polo
26 August - Juan les Pins
27 August - Monte-Carlo
29 August - Bastelica
31 August - Libourne
1er September - Escoubes
4 September - Cassis
6 September - Peyrecave
7 September - Castelnau Medo
12 to 14 September - Salonique
15 et 16 September - Belgrade
20 September - Gala des étoiles
October - Valence
18 to 22 December - Gala to Gabon

1970s

1970 
January - Papeete
7 to 11 February - Tour Italie
14 to 20 February - Téhéran
3 May - Paris (Pleyel)
8 to 15 July - Gala en Grèce
September - Grèce (Miss univers)
23 November - Lugano (Switzerland)
Ostende
Genève, Hôtel intercontinental (Switzerland)

1971 
January - Belgrade; Gala de clôture at International film festival of Belgrade + 2 concerts
March - Brasov, Romania ("Golden Stag Festival")
17 October - Marlenheim
30 October - La Côte Saint-André
31 October - Auxerre
1er November - Clermont-Ferrand
3 November - Aurillac
4 November - Mazamet
5 November - Cahors
6 November - Angoulème
7 November - Tours
22 November to 5 December - Paris (Olympia)
Beyrouth

1972 
24 June - Eaubonne
1er July - Spa
2 July - Yvoy le Marron
14 July - Cot Chiavari
16 July - Maubeuge
23 July - Luzinian
26 July - Fréjus
27 July - Nice
11 December - Orléans
22 December - Charenton
23 December - Château Thierry

1973 
6 et 7 January - Beyrouth
13 January - Paris (Mutualité)
20 January - La Celle Saint-Cloud
7 du 15 February, sauf 9 et 11 - Japon
3 March - Paris (Mutualité)
27 April - Saint-Louis
5 May - Genissiat par Bellegarde
19 May - Nîmes
26 May - Montville
3 June - L'Aigle
10 June - Levier
16 June - Malakoff
24 June - Pithiviers
28 June - Vincennes (Cirque J. Richard); fête des républicains indépendants
1er July - Serifontaine
14 July - Maubeuge
14 July - Hénin
21 July - Vedene
15 November - Madrid
24 November - Thônex
4 to 9 December - Beyrouth

1974 
15 January - Paris (Olympia)
6 August - Narbonne
7 to 15 February - Japon
1 May - Compiègne
4 May - Toulouse
May - Genève (Switzerland)
9 July to 17 August - podium Sud radio
12 July - Foix
10 November - Zedelgem
Caen
Besançon

1975 
13 January - Paris (Olympia); Musicorama
8 March - Dortmund
20 March - La rochelle
26 March - Hambourg
6 April - Canada
18 May - Nîmes
8 June - Briançon
17 June - Troyes
26 July - Tunisie
July - Mont-de-Marsan
14 to 19 October - Canada (Place des arts) 
20 October - Victoriaville
21 to 25 October - Québec
26 October - Shawinigan
Saint-Jean
Trois-Rivières
6 November - Verdun
Caen
Dax

1976 
23 April - Chalais (Switzerland)
2 December - Epinal
3 December - Nancy
4 December - Troyes
6 December - Reims
7 December - Lille
8 December - Halluin
9 December - Abbeville
10 December - Douai
11 December - Evreux
14 December - Toulouse
15 December - Albi
16 December - Pamiers
17 December - La grande motte

1977 
4 to 26 January - Paris (Olympia)
10 to 13 February - Montréal (Salle Wilfrid-Pelletier)
14 February - Province
15 to 20 February - Québec
21 to 23 February - Province
24 to 27 February - Montréal (Salle Wilfrid-Pelletier)
15 April - Garches
June - Beaunes
July - Tour in Middle East
23 July - Marseille
24 July - Maubeuge
10 September - Cambrai
7 October - Bruxelles
17 et 18 December - Prague
20 December - Kosice

1978 
14 January - Bruxelles
11 February - Rouen (Théâtre des arts)
25 February - Puisieux
3 March - Tubize
4 March - Amiens
25 March - Saint-étienne
26 March - Château Meillan; matinée
15 April ... - Tour in Middle East
April - Istanbul
April - Izmir
17 et 18 April - Jordanie
30 April - Valence; matinée
13 May - Knokke le Zoute
14 May - Blet; matinée
27 May - Aclens (Switzerland)
3 June - Troyes
9 June - Nivelles
17 June - Niederbronn
24 June - Longwy
25 July - Cannes (Casino d'hiver); Private gala Kashoggi
29 September - Delémont (Switzerland)
30 September - Annecy
2 October - Agen
3 October - Saint-Julien en Genêvois
7 October - Bruxelles (Forest National)
15 November to 17 December - Canada
29 November - New-York
Ankara

1979 
22 January to 5 February - Indian Ocean; Iles Maurice, Madagascar, Réunion, Seychelles
14 to 27 February - South America; Brésil, Argentine, Mexique
2 to 8 March - Espagne; Madrid, Barcelone, Valence, Séville, Malaga, Bilbao
10 to 23 March - Tour Afrique noir
29 March - Evreux
31 March - Nogent sur Marne
8 April - Reunion of Dalida fan club
15 April - Clermont-Ferrand
19 May - Marseille
20 May - Allones
24 May - Cravant les Côteaux
31 May to 3 June - Le Caire
24 June - Lésignan
29 June - Monte Carlo (Sporting-Club)
30 June - Marseille
1er July - Draguignan
7 July - Marignane
9 July - Toulouse
14 July - Ostende
23 July - Saint-Vincent de Tyrosse
28 July - Knokke le Zoute
2 September - Lavaur
3 September - Cavaillon
7 to 14 September - Liban
16 to 19 September - Liban
18 October - Montpellier

1980s

1980 
5 to 20 January - Paris (Palais des sports)
21 March - Saint-étienne
23 April - Genève, Patinoire des Vernets (Switzerland)
June - Athènes (Stade Coubertin)
11 July - Maubeuge
18 July - Daglan
30 July - Ajaccio (Stade Coty)
4 August - Mimizan
8 August - Sète
9 August - La Grande-motte
11 August - Colmar
11 August - Cannes
13 August - Alès
14 August - Gemenos
15 August - Barcelonnette
16 August - Canet-plage
18 August - Cannes
19 August - Nice
 6 September - Moutier, patinoire (Switzerland)
Saint-Jean-De-Luz

1981 
31 January - El Menzah (Palais des sports)
18 March to 19 April, sauf 25 et 30 March, 6 April - Paris (Olympia)
21 April - Lille
7 to 10 May - Abu Dhabi
6 June - Knokke-le-Zoute
8 August - Périgueux
16 October - Paris (Esplanade Palais de Chaillot)
17 October - Paris (Trocadéro)

1982 
21 July - Maubeuge
December - Istres
Allemagne; Munich, Dusseldorf, Berlin

1983 
11 February - Varsovie; 2 représentations
12 et 13 February - Katowice; 4 représentations
9 October - Vincennes (Force ouvrière)
10 November - Alger
Le Caire

1984 
24 March - Bruxelles
25 February - Belgique
16 et 17 April - Montréal
18 et 19 April - Québec
20 April - Ottawa
24 to 29 April - Etats-Unis, Broadway, New-York, Los-Angeles
18 May - Marseille
May 1984 - Reims, Provins
24 May - Beauvais
6 June - Belley
7 June - Albertville
8 June - Annecy
9 June - Annemasse
11 June - Oyonnax
12 June - Lons-le-saulnier
13 June - Dôle
14 June - Besançon
15 June - Vesoul
16 June - Epinal
21 July - Aix-les-thermes
22 July - Trie sur braise
23 July - Luchon
24 July - Bagneres-de-bigorre
25 July - Argelest-gazost
26 July - Cazaubon barbotan
27 July - Valence d'agen
28 July - Aurignac
29 July - Fumel
30 July - Aiguillon
31 July - Agen
2 August - Barcarès
3 August - Cap d'Agde
4 August - Narbonne plage
5 August - Canet plage
6 August - Argelès-sur-Mer
7 August - Canet Brasilia
8 August - Valras
9 August - Coursan
10 August - Gruissan
11 August - Saint-Cyprien
12 August - Grau d'Agde
13 August - Limoux
14 August - Béziers
15 aout - Auch
16 August - Toulouse
1er September - Ostende

1985 
February -İstanbul -Yıldız Palace (Silahtar mansion)
9 March - Paris - Reunion of Dalida fan club
8 May 1985 - Munich (Deutsches theater)
9 May - Düsseldorf (Schuhmann saal)
10 May 1985 - Berlin (Philharmonie)
12 May - Stuttgart (Liederhalle)
13 May - Berne, Kursaal (Switzerland)
14 May - Zurich, Bernhard Theater (Switzerland)
15 May - Genève, Grand Casino (Switzerland)
13 July - Knokke le zoute
July - Hyères

1986 
Le Caire
July - Seychelles, 2 concerts
24 et 25 October - Los Angeles (Shrine auditorium)
Londres

1987 
5 April - Paris - Reunion of Dalida fan club
29 April 1987 - Antalya

References

Sources 

Live performances
Music-related lists